Adobe Photoshop is a graphics editor developed and published by Adobe.

Photoshop may also refer to:

 Adobe Photoshop Elements software, a consumer level edition of the Adobe Photoshop software
 Photoshop contest, a competition to produce digitally modified images
 Photoshopping, a slang term originally taken from Adobe Photoshop and now used generically for digitally altering photographs
 "Photoshop", a song by Bis from their 1997 album The New Transistor Heroes